The 20th Fighter Wing is a wing of the United States Air Force and the host unit at Shaw Air Force Base South Carolina.  The wing is assigned to Air Combat Command's Fifteenth Air Force.

The wing's mission is to provide, project, and sustain combat-ready aircraft in conventional and anti-radiation suppression of enemy air defenses, strategic attack, counter-air, air interdiction, joint maritime operations and combat search-and-rescue missions.

History

The 20th Fighter Wing was established on 20 July 1947 at Shaw Field, South Carolina and activated on 15 August. Upon its activation, the 20th commanded the functions of both the support groups as well as the flying 20th Fighter Group and the squadrons assigned to it.  On 26 August 1948, the wing's 20th Airdrome Group was discontinued and its elements became realigned under the 20th Air Base Group.

On 15 December 1993, the flight line at RAF Upper Heyford was closed. The wing moved without personnel and equipment from the UK to South Carolina on 1 January 1994, inheriting the personnel and equipment of the 363d Fighter Wing.

Two F-16s from the wing collided during a training flight on 15 October 2009.  One F-16, piloted by Captain Lee Bryant, was able to land safely at Shaw. The other plane, piloted by Captain Nicholas Giglio, 32, apparently crashed into the ocean.  Authorities believe that Giglio was killed instantly in the collision and did not eject. An accident investigation board determined that the crash was caused by pilot error.  The board stated that Giglio was flying too fast and was not paying adequate attention as he attempted to rejoin Bryant's aircraft for the return flight to Shaw.

Units
The 20th Fighter Wing is composed of four groups each with specific functions. The Operations Group controls all flying and airfield operations. The Maintenance Group performs maintenance of aircraft, ground equipment and aircraft components.  The Mission Support Group has a wide range of responsibilities,a few of its functions are Security, Civil Engineering, Communications, Personnel Management, Logistics, Services and Contracting support. While the Medical Group provides medical and dental care.
 20th Operations Group
 55th Fighter Squadron
 77th Fighter Squadron
 79th Fighter Squadron
 20th Operations Support Squadron
 20th Maintenance Group
 55th Fighter Generation Squadron
 77th Fighter Generation Squadron
 79th Fighter Generation Squadron
 20th Component Maintenance Squadron
 20th Equipment Maintenance Squadron
 20th Maintenance Operations Squadron
 20th Mission Support Group
 20th Communications Squadron
 20th Contracting Squadron
 20th Security Forces Squadron
 20th Force Support Squadron
 20th Logistics Readiness Squadron
 20th Civil Engineering Squadron (20 CES)
 20th Medical Group
 20th Health Care Operations Squadron
 20th Operational Medical Readiness Squadron
 20th Comptroller Squadron

Lineage
 Established as the 20 Fighter Wing on 28 July 1947
 Organized on 15 August 1947
 Discontinued on 26 August 1948
 Activated on 24 August 1948
 Redesignated 20 Fighter-Bomber Wing on 20 January 1950
 Redesignated 20 Tactical Fighter Wing on 8 July 1958
 Redesignated 20 Fighter Wing on 1 October 1991

Assignments

 Ninth Air Force, 15 August 1947 – 26 August 1948, 24 August 1948
 Fourteenth Air Force, 1 February 1949
 Tactical Air Command, 1 August 1950
 Ninth Air Force, 22 January 1951 (attached to: Tactical Air Division, Provisional, 25 April – 10 October 1951, Tactical Air Command after 6 November 1951)
 Tactical Air Command, 1 December 1951 (attached to 49th Air Division after 12 February 1952)

 United States Air Forces in Europe, 31 May 1952 (remained attached to 49th Air Division)
 Third Air Force, 5 June 1952 (remained attached to 49th Air Division until 1 July 1956)
 Seventeenth Air Force, 1 July 1961
 Third Air Force, 1 September 1963 – 1 January 1994
 Ninth Air Force, 1 January 1994 – 2009
 Ninth Air Force, 5 August 2009 – 2020
 Fifteenth Air Force, 2020 - present

Flying components
Group
 20th Fighter Group (later 20 Fighter-Bomber Group, 20 Operations Group): 15 August 1947 – 26 August 1948, 14 August 1948 – 8 February 1955; 31 March 1992 – 1 January 1994; 1 January 1994 – present (detached 26 July-c. 17 December 1950 and 25 April – 10 October 1951)
 20th Maint, Mission Support Groups etc
Squadrons
 42d Electronic Combat Squadron: assigned 1 July 1983 – 1 June 1985, attached 2 June 1985 – 24 January 1991, assigned 25 January 1991 – 1 July 1992.
 55th Fighter-Bomber Squadron (later 55th Tactical Fighter Squadron, 55th Fighter Squadron): attached 15 November 1952 – 7 February 1955, assigned 8 February 1955 – 31 March 1992
 77th Fighter-Bomber Squadron (later 77th Tactical Fighter Squadron, 77th Fighter Squadron): attached 15 November 1952 – 7 February 1955, assigned 8 February 1955 – 31 March 1992
 79th Fighter-Bomber Squadron (later 79th Tactical Fighter Squadron, 79th Fighter Squadron): attached 15 November 1952 – 7 February 1955, assigned 8 February 1955 – 31 March 1992

Stations
 Shaw Field (later Shaw Air Force Base), South Carolina, 15 August 1947 – 26 August 1948, 24 August 1948 – 9 November 1951
 Langley Air Force Base, Virginia, 9 November 1951 – 22 May 1952
 RAF Wethersfield, England, 31 May 1952 – 1 April 1970
 RAF Woodbridge, England, 1 October 1954 – 1 April 1970 (79th only)
 RAF Upper Heyford, England, 1 April 1970 – 1 January 1994
 Shaw Air Force Base, South Carolina, 1 January 1994 – present

Aircraft operated

 Republic F-84B/D/G Thunderjet (1948–1955)
 Republic F-84F Thunderstreak (1955–1957)
 North American F-100D Super Sabre (1957–1971)
 General Dynamics F-111 Aardvark (1970–1993)
 General Dynamics–Grumman EF-111A Raven (1984–1992)
 General Dynamics F-16 Fighting Falcon, 1994 – present

Awards
 Air Force Outstanding Unit Award, 1 June 1999 - 31 May 2001
 Air Force Outstanding Unit Award, 1 June 2013 - 31 May 2014
 Air Force Outstanding Unit Award, 1 June 2014 - 31 May 2015
 Air Force Meritorious Unit Award, 1 June 2018 - 31 May 2020

References

Notes

 Explanatory notes

 Citations

Bibliography

 This article includes content from Shaw AFB Website's history page.

 
 
 
 * 
 
 USAAS-USAAC-USAAF-USAF Aircraft Serial Numbers—1908 to present
 Shaw AFB Home Page

Military units and formations in South Carolina
0020
Military units and formations established in 1947